Francisco Javier "Fran" Álvarez Rodríguez (born 21 January 1998) is a Spanish footballer who plays as a midfielder for Albacete Balompié.

Club career
Born in Socovos, Albacete, Castilla-La Mancha, Álvarez was a Villarreal CF youth graduate. He made his senior debut with the reserves on 19 August 2017, coming on as a second-half substitute for Dani Raba in a 1–0 Segunda División B away win over CD Atlético Baleares, but spent the vast majority of the campaign playing for the C-team in Tercera División.

On 16 January 2020, Álvarez moved to another reserve team, Real Valladolid Promesas also in the third division. On 7 July 2021, he signed a one-year deal with Albacete Balompié, freshly relegated to Primera División RFEF.

On 21 June 2022, after being regularly used as Alba achieved promotion to the second division, Álvarez signed a new one-year contract with the club. He made his professional debut on 9 October, replacing goalscorer Manu Fuster in a 1–1 home draw against CD Tenerife.

References

External links

1998 births
Living people
People from the Province of Albacete
Spanish footballers
Footballers from Castilla–La Mancha
Association football midfielders
Segunda División players
Primera Federación players
Segunda División B players
Tercera División players
Villarreal CF C players
Villarreal CF B players
Real Valladolid Promesas players
Albacete Balompié players